Marko Sočanac (born 4 July 1978) is a Serbian former professional footballer who played as a defender.

Career
After starting out at his hometown club Bane, Sočanac was transferred to Sartid Smederevo in June 2000. He spent the next eight years with the Oklopnici, helping the side win the Serbia and Montenegro Cup in the 2002–03 season. After leaving Smederevo, Sočanac moved abroad and joined Chinese Super League club Qingdao Jonoon, making 20 appearances in the 2009 CSL season.

Career statistics

Honours
Sartid Smederevo
 Serbia and Montenegro Cup: 2002–03

References

External links
 
 
 

Association football defenders
Chinese Super League players
Expatriate footballers in China
First League of Serbia and Montenegro players
FK Bane players
FK Mladi Radnik players
FK Novi Pazar players
FK Smederevo players
FK Sopot players
People from Raška, Serbia
Qingdao Hainiu F.C. (1990) players
Serbia and Montenegro footballers
Serbian expatriate footballers
Serbian expatriate sportspeople in China
Serbian First League players
Serbian footballers
Serbian SuperLiga players
1978 births
Living people